The Bantu expansion is a hypothesis about the history of the major series of migrations of the original Proto-Bantu-speaking group, which spread from an original nucleus around Central Africa across much of sub-Saharan Africa. In the process, the Proto-Bantu-speaking settlers displaced or absorbed pre-existing hunter-gatherer and pastoralist groups that they encountered.

The primary evidence for this expansion is linguistic – a great many of the languages which are spoken across sub-Equatorial Africa are remarkably similar to each other, suggesting the common cultural origin of their original speakers. The linguistic core of the Bantu languages, which comprise a branch of the Atlantic-Congo language family, was located in the southern regions of Cameroon. However, attempts to trace the exact route of the expansion, to correlate it with archaeological evidence and genetic evidence, have not been conclusive; thus although the expansion is widely accepted as having taken place, many aspects of it remain in doubt or are highly contested.

The expansion is believed to have taken place in at least two waves, between about 3,000 and 2,000 years ago (approximately 1,000 BC to AD 1). Linguistic analysis suggests that the expansion proceeded in two directions: the first went across or along the Northern border of the Congo forest region (towards East Africa), and the second – and possibly others – went south along the African coast into Republic of the Congo, Gabon, Cameroon, the Democratic Republic of the Congo, and Angola, or inland along the many south-to-north flowing rivers of the Congo River system. The expansion reached South Africa, probably as early as AD 300.

Theories on expansion
The origin or “homeland” of this process is generally believed to be near the border of Nigeria and Cameroon. The 60,000-km2 Mambilla region straddling the borderlands here has been identified as containing remnants of "the Bantu who stayed home" as the bulk of Bantu-speakers moved away from the region. Archaeological evidence from the separate works of Jean Hurault (1979, 1986 & 1988) and Rigobert Tueché (2000) in the region reveals that this region has been inhabited by the same culture for 5 millennia, from 3000 B.C to date. The majority of the groups of the Bamenda highlands (occupied for 2 millennia to date), somewhat south and contiguous with the Mambilla region, have an ancient history of descent from the north in the direction of the Mambilla region.

Initially, archaeologists believed that they could find archaeological similarities in the region's ancient cultures that the Bantu-speakers were held to have traversed. Linguists, classifying the languages and creating a genealogical table of relationships, believed they could reconstruct material culture elements. They believed that the expansion was caused by the development of agriculture, the making of ceramics, and the use of iron, which permitted new ecological zones to be exploited. In 1966, Roland Oliver published an article presenting these correlations as a reasonable hypothesis.

The hypothesized Bantu expansion pushed out or assimilated the hunter-forager proto-Khoisan, who had formerly inhabited Southern Africa. In Eastern and Southern Africa, Bantu speakers may have adopted livestock husbandry from other unrelated Cushitic-and Nilotic-speaking peoples they encountered. Herding practices reached the far south several centuries before Bantu-speaking migrants did. Archaeological, linguistic, genetic, and environmental evidence all support the conclusion that the Bantu expansion was a significant human migration.

Based on dental evidence, Irish (2016) concluded that the common ancestors of Central African and Proto-Bantu peoples may have originated in the western Southern region of the Sahara, amid the Kiffian period at Gobero, and may have migrated southward, from the Sahara into various parts of central  Africa (e.g. Cameroon, Gabon, Central African Republic), as a result of desertification of the Green Sahara in 7000 BC. From Cameroon, agricultural Proto-Bantu peoples began to migrate, and amid migration, diverged into East Bantu peoples (e.g., Democratic Republic of Congo) and West Bantu peoples (e.g. Congo, Gabon) between 2500 BC and 1200 BC.

Atlantic–Congo languages

The Atlantic-Congo family comprises a huge group of languages spread throughout Western, Central and Southern Africa. The Benue–Congo branch includes the Bantu languages, which are found throughout Central, Southern, and Eastern Africa.

A characteristic feature of most Atlantic–Congo languages, including almost all the Bantu languages except Swahili, is their use of tone. They generally lack case inflection, but grammatical gender is characteristic, with some languages having two dozen genders (noun classes). The root of the verb tends to remain unchanged, with either particles or auxiliary verbs expressing tenses and moods. For example, in a number of languages the infinitival is the auxiliary designating the future.

Pre-expansion-era demography
Before the expansion of Bantu-speaking farmers, Central, Southern, and Southeast Africa was populated by Pygmy foragers, Khoisan-speaking hunter-gatherers, Nilo-Saharan-speaking herders, and Cushitic-speaking pastoralists.

Central Africa
It is thought that Central African Pygmies and Bantus branched out from a common ancestral population c. 70,000 years ago. Many Batwa groups speak Bantu languages; however, a considerable portion of their vocabulary is not Bantu in origin. Much of this vocabulary is botanical, deals with honey collecting, or is otherwise specialised for the forest and is shared between western Batwa groups. It has been proposed that this is the remnant of an independent western Batwa (Mbenga or "Baaka") language.

Southern Africa
Before the Bantu expansion, Khoisan-speaking peoples inhabited Southern Africa. Their descendants have largely mixed with other peoples and adopted other languages. A few still live by foraging often supplemented by working for neighbouring farmers in the arid regions around the Kalahari desert, while a larger number of Nama continue their traditional subsistence by raising livestock in Namibia and adjacent South Africa.

Southeast Africa
Prior to the arrival of Bantus in Southeast Africa, Cushitic-speaking peoples had migrated into the region from the Ethiopian Highlands and other more northerly areas. The first waves consisted of Southern Cushitic speakers, who settled around Lake Turkana and parts of Tanzania beginning around 5,000 years ago. Many centuries later, around AD 1000, some Eastern Cushitic speakers also settled in northern and coastal Kenya.

Khoisan-speaking hunter-gatherers also inhabited Southeast Africa before the Bantu expansion.

Nilo-Saharan-speaking herder populations comprised a third group of the area's pre-Bantu expansion inhabitants.

Expansion
 

Linguistic, archeological and genetic evidence indicates that during the course of the Bantu expansion, "independent waves of migration of western African and East African Bantu-speakers into southern Africa occurred." In some places, genetic evidence suggests that Bantu language expansion was largely a result of substantial population replacement. In other places, Bantu language expansion, like many other languages, has been documented with population genetic evidence to have occurred by means other than complete or predominant population replacement (e.g. via language shift and admixture of incoming and existing populations). For example, one study found this to be the case in Bantu language speakers who are African Pygmies or are in Mozambique, while another population genetic study found this to be the case in the Bantu language-speaking Lemba of Southern Africa. Where Bantu was adopted via language shift of existing populations, prior African languages were spoken, probably from African language families that are now lost, except as substrate influences of local Bantu languages (such as click sounds in local Bantu languages).

c. 3000BC to c. AD 500
It seems likely that the expansion of the Bantu-speaking people from their core region in West Africa began around 4000–3500BC. Although early models posited that the early speakers were both iron-using and agricultural, definitive archaeological evidence that they used iron does not appear until as late as 400BC, though they were agricultural.  The western branch, not necessarily linguistically distinct, according to Christopher Ehret, followed the coast and the major rivers of the Congo system southward, reaching central Angola by around 500BC.

It is clear that there were human populations in the region at the time of the expansion, and pygmies are their closest living relatives. However, mtDNA genetic research from Cabinda suggests that only haplogroups that originated in West Africa are found there today, and the distinctive L0 of the pre-Bantu population is missing, suggesting that there was a complete population replacement. In South Africa, however, a more complex intermixing could have taken place.

Further east, Bantu-speaking communities had reached the great Central African rainforest, and by 500BC, pioneering groups had emerged into the savannas to the south, in what are now the Democratic Republic of Congo, Angola, and Zambia.

Another stream of migration, having moved east by 3,000 years ago (1000BC), was creating a major new population center near the Great Lakes of East Africa, where a rich environment supported a dense population. The Urewe culture dominated the Great Lakes region between 650BC and 550BC. It was one of Africa's oldest iron-smelting centres. By the first century BC, Bantu speaking communities in the great lakes region developed iron forging techniques that enabled them to produce carbon steel.

Movements by small groups to the southeast from the Great Lakes region were more rapid, with initial settlements widely dispersed near the coast and near rivers, due to comparatively difficult farming conditions in areas farther from water. Archaeological findings have shown that by 100 BC to 300 AD, Bantu speaking communities were present at the coastal areas of Misasa in Tanzania and  Kwale in Kenya. These communities also integrated and intermarried with the communities already present at the coast. Between 300 AD-1000 AD, through participation in the long-existing Indian Ocean trade route, these communities established links with Arabian and Indian traders, leading to the development of the Swahili culture. Other pioneering groups had reached modern KwaZulu-Natal in South Africa by AD 300 along the coast, and the modern Limpopo Province (formerly Northern Transvaal) by AD 500.

From the 11th century to 17th century
Between the 11th and 16th centuries, powerful Bantu-speaking states on a scale larger than local chiefdoms began to emerge. Notable early kingdoms include the Kingdom of the Kongo in present day Angola and the Democratic Republic of the Congo, the Bunyoro Kitara Kingdom in the Great Lakes region, the Kingdom of Mapungubwe (c.1075–c.1220) in present day South Africa, and the Zambezi River, where the Monomatapa kings built the Great Zimbabwe complex. The Swahili city-states were also established early in this period. These include sultanates based at Lamu, Mombasa, Kilwa, Pate and Malindi. The Swahili traded with the inland kingdoms, including Great Zimbabwe. Such processes of state-formation occurred with increasing frequency from the 16th century onward. They likely resulted from denser population, which led to more specialised divisions of labour, including military power, while making outmigration more effortful. Other factors promoting state-formation were increased trade among African communities and with European and Arab traders on the coasts, technological innovations in economic activity, and new techniques in the political-spiritual ritualisation of royalty as the source of national strength and health. Other inland centres established during this phase of expansion include Bigo bya Mugenyi in Uganda, Thimlich Ohinga in Kenya and the Kweneng' Ruins in South Africa.

Criticism

Manfred K. H. Eggert stated that "the current archaeological record in the Central African rainforest is extremely spotty and consequently far from convincing so as to be taken as a reflection of a steady influx of Bantu speakers into the forest, let alone movement on a larger scale."

See also
 Bantu peoples
 Matrilineal belt
 Pre-modern human migration

References

Further reading

 

 
 
 
 
 
 
 .

External links
 
 Bantu Expansion and Hunter-gatherers
 

Demographic history of Africa
Prehistoric migrations
Prehistoric Africa
Internal migrations in Africa
1st millennium BC
Archaeology of Central Africa
Archaeology of Southern Africa
Archaeology of Eastern Africa